Simulation and Gaming: An Interdisciplinary Journal of Theory, Practice and Research, is a bimonthly peer-reviewed scientific journal that covers the field of computer simulation and gaming, including virtual reality, serious games and educational games. The editors-in-chief are Toshiko Kikkawa and Marlies P. Schijven. It was established in 1970 and is published by SAGE Publications.

Abstracting and indexing
The journal is abstracted and indexed in:
Academic Search
EBSCO databases
ERIC
Inspec
PsycINFO
Scopus

References

External links

SAGE Publishing academic journals
English-language journals
Computer science journals
Bimonthly journals
Publications established in 1970